Urashima may refer to:
Urashima Tarō, a hero from a Japanese fairy tale
Arisaema thunbergii subsp. urashima, a plant widespread in Japan